Little Rock is an unincorporated community and census-designated place (CDP) in Mayes County, Oklahoma, United States. It was first listed as a CDP prior to the 2020 census.

The CDP is in southeastern Mayes County, bordered to the east by Rose and to the south by Snake Creek. U.S. Route 412, the Cherokee Turnpike, passes through the community, with access from Exit 6 at Locust Grove,  to the southwest, and from Exit 17 between Rose and Leach, the same distance to the east.

Snake Creek, a southwest-flowing tributary of the Neosho River, forms the southern boundary of the CDP.

Demographics

References 

Census-designated places in Mayes County, Oklahoma
Census-designated places in Oklahoma